Cornelius Greither (born 1956) is a German mathematician specialising in Iwasawa theory and the structure of Galois modules.

Education and career 

Greither completed his PhD in 1983 at the Ludwig-Maximilians-Universität München under the supervision of Bodo Pareigis: his thesis bears the title Zum Kürzungsproblem kommutativer Algebren.
He habilitated in 1988 at same university, with thesis title Cyclic Galois extensions and normal bases.

In 1992, Greither proved the Iwasawa main conjecture for abelian number fields in the  case.
In 1999, together with D. R. Rapogle, K. Rubin, and A. Srivastav, he proved a converse to the Hilbert–Speiser theorem.

As of 2021, Greither is a full professor at the Universität der Bundeswehr München; he is supposed to retire from this university by October 2022.

Greither is on the editorial boards of the journals Archivum mathematicum Brno, New York Journal of Mathematics, as well as the Journal de Théorie des Nombres Bordeaux. Until 2014, he was an associate editor of Annales mathématiques du Québec.

References 

1956 births
Living people
20th-century German mathematicians
21st-century German mathematicians
Place of birth missing (living people)
Number theorists